Soso Bekoshvili is a Georgian rugby union player. He currently plays as a prop for CA Brive in the Top 14.

References

Expatriate rugby union players from Georgia (country)
Expatriate rugby union players in France
Expatriate sportspeople from Georgia (country) in France
Living people
Rugby union players from Georgia (country)
Rugby union props
1993 births
Georgia international rugby union players